Carl Nielsen's  Aladdin, Opus 34/FS 89, is incidental music written to accompany a new production of Adam Oehlenschläger’s "dramatic fairy tale" presented at The Royal Theatre in Copenhagen in February 1919.

Background

Nielsen composed much of the music in Skagen during the summer of 1918, completing it after returning to Copenhagen in January 1919. He experienced major difficulties with the work as the director, Johannes Poulsen, had used the orchestra pit for an extended stage, leaving the orchestra cramped below a majestic staircase on the set. When Poulsen cut out large parts of the music during final rehearsals and changed the sequence of dances, Nielsen demanded that his name be removed from the posters and the programme. In fact, the theatre production in February 1919 was not very successful and was withdrawn after only 15 performances.

Music

Complete score
The complete score, lasting over 80 minutes, is Nielsen's longest work apart from his operas. Demonstrating great inventiveness, Nielsen's enriched style can be observed in the musical language he used for the exotic dances, paving the way for his Fifth Symphony. In May 1992 a recording of virtually the entire score was made by the Danish Radio Symphony Orchestra and Chamber Choir with Gennady Rozhdestvensky.

Aladdin suite

Nielsen frequently conducted extracts from Aladdin to great popular acclaim both in Denmark and abroad. The music was successfully presented at London’s Queen's Hall on 22 June 1923 and at 12 performances of Aladdin at the Deutsches Schauspielhaus in Hamburg in November and December 1929. Nielsen had been scheduled to conduct extracts with the Radio Symphony Orchestra on 1 October 1931 when he suffered a major heart attack. Lying on a hospital bed, he was nevertheless able to listen to the Oriental March, Hindu Dance and Negro Dance on a crystal set before he died the following day.
The extracts were published in 1940 as the Aladdin suite. Its seven parts are:
 Oriental Festival March
 Aladdin's Dream/Dance of the Morning Mist
 Hindu Dance
 Chinese Dance
 The Marketplace in Isphahan
 Dance of the Prisoners
 Negro Dance
A transcription for piano of the Oriental Festival March was published by Borup's Musikforlag in Copenhagen in 1926. 
On the basis of information from the Carl Nielsen Society, the Aladdin Suite is currently one of Nielsen's most widely performed works.

Three songs
Nielsen published Aladdin, three songs from the play by A. Oehlenschlæger in 1919 as his Opus 34. The songs are:
 Cithar, lad min Bøn dig røre
 Visselulle nu, Barnlil!
 Alt Maanen oprejst staar

See also
 Music of Denmark

References

Compositions by Carl Nielsen
Incidental music
1919 compositions
Orchestral suites
Adaptations of works by Adam Oehlenschläger